Aleksander Pychowski (3 November 1903 – 20 October 1943) was a Polish footballer.

Football career
He played in three matches for the Poland national football team from 1925 to 1926.

He played for Cracovia from 1925 to 1926 when he transferred to its rival Wisla Krakow, for whom he played until 1935. He was a slightly built though athletic man, who played in his spectacles.

Personal life and death
In the German occupation of Poland in the Second World War Pychowski worked with the Polish underground resistance. In October 1943, finding the Gestapo surrounding the building where he lived in Krakow, he committed suicide to avoid anticipated capture although the Germans were seeking another person. He is buried in the Salwator Cemetery in Krakow.

References

External links
 

1903 births
1943 deaths
Polish footballers
Poland international footballers
Footballers from Kraków
Burials at Salwator Cemetery
Association footballers not categorized by position
Polish resistance members of World War II
Suicides in Poland
1943 suicides